Jack Hanbury (1904 - Jan. 1968). was a British film producer.

Films he has produced include Sky West and Crooked and Three Hats for Lisa.

External links

References

1904 births
1968 deaths
British film producers